Blessed Antoni Zawistowski (1882–1942) was a Polish priest and professor of theology at the Catholic University of Lublin. He was beaten to death in Dachau concentration camp. He was beatified by Pope John Paul II in 1999 as one of 108 Polish Martyrs of World War II.

See also 
List of Nazi-German concentration camps
The Holocaust in Poland
World War II casualties of Poland

Further reading
 Prions en Église, n° 258, p. 16 (Éditions Bayard)

References

External links
 Liste des 108 martyrs
 Homélie du pape Jean Paul II pour la béatification des 108 martyrs

1882 births
1942 deaths
Polish people who died in Dachau concentration camp
Polish beatified people
20th-century Polish Roman Catholic priests